Kingsmead Cricket Ground in Durban, South Africa was established in 1922 and hosted its first international cricket match in January 1923. The ground's first Test saw South Africa played the touring England cricket team. It hosted its first One Day International (ODI) in 1992 following the readmission of South Africa to international cricket after the sporting boycott of South Africa during the apartheid era, and its first Twenty20 International (T20I) in 2007. Two women's Test matches have been played on the ground, the first in 1960, and a single women's T20I was played in 2016.

In cricket, a five-wicket haul (also known as a "five-for" or "fifer") refers to a bowler taking five or more wickets in a single innings. This is regarded as a notable achievement. This article details the five-wicket hauls taken on the ground in official international Test matches, One Day Internationals and Twenty20 Internationals.

The first international five-wicket hauls taken on the ground was by Englishman Alec Kennedy who took five wickets for the cost of 88 runs (5/88) in the ground's first Test match in 1923. The 8/69 taken by South African Hugh Tayfield against England in 1957 set a new best bowling analysis by a South African in Test matches and remain the best innings bowling figures in Test matches on the ground. The first five-wicket haul in women's Tests on the ground was taken by South Africa's Jean McNaughton in the first women's Test played on the ground in 1960.

The first five-wicket haul in an ODI on the ground was taken by Pakistan's Waqar Younis in 1993, whilst India's Ashish Nehra recorded the best bowling ODI figures of 6/23 during a 2003 Cricket World Cup match against England. Only one five-wicket haul has been taken in a T20I on the ground, David Wiese of South Africa taking 5/23 in 2015.

Key

Test match five-wicket hauls

A total of 60 five-wicket hauls have been taken on the ground in Test matches, including three taken in women's Tests.

Men's matches

Women's matches

One Day International five-wicket hauls

Four five-wicket hauls have been taken in men's ODI matches on the ground.

Twenty20 International five-wicket hauls

Two five-wicket hauls have been taken in T20I matches on the ground - one in men's matches and one in women's matches.

Men's matches

Women's matches

Notes

References

External links
International five-wicket hauls at Kingsmead, CricInfo

Kingsmead
Kingsmead